Nerophila is a monotypic genus of flowering plants belonging to the family Melastomataceae. The only species is Nerophila gentianoides.

Its native range is Tropical Africa.

References

Melastomataceae
Melastomataceae genera
Monotypic Myrtales genera